Leuciacria is a genus of butterflies in the family Pieridae.

Species
Leuciacria acuta Rothschild & Jordan, 1905
Leuciacria olivei Müller, C, 1999

References

Pierini
Pieridae genera